Events from the year 1774 in Russia

Incumbents
 Monarch – Catherine II

Events

 
 
  
  
 
 
 Battle of Kazan (1774)
 Pugachev's Rebellion
 Treaty of Küçük Kaynarca

Births

Deaths

References

1774 in Russia
Years of the 18th century in the Russian Empire